Cajabamba Province is a province of the Cajamarca Region in Peru. The capital of the province is Cajabamba.

Political division 
The province measures  and is divided into four districts:

See also 
 Q'inququcha
 Yawarqucha

References 
  Instituto Nacional de Estadística e Informática. Banco de Información Digital. Retrieved November 4, 2007.

Provinces of the Cajamarca Region